Union Central may refer to:

 Club Unión Central, a Bolivian soccer team
 National trade union center, a federation or confederation of trade unions in a single country
 Union Central Life Insurance Company